Agama weidholzi, the Gambia agama, is a species of lizard in the family Agamidae. It is a small lizard found in Senegal, Gambia, Mali, and Guinea-Bissau.

References

Agama (genus)
Reptiles described in 1932
Taxa named by Otto von Wettstein